Mark Threadgold (born 1977) is a contemporary Australian painter. Threadgold lives and works in Melbourne. He won the 2008 Corangamarah Art Prize and was selected as a finalist in the Metro 5 Art Award, Australia's richest art prize for Australian artist's under the age of 35 in 2005, 2006, and 2007. His work is held in public collections in Australia and in private collections around the world. He has exhibited in selected group shows and solo exhibitions throughout Australia since 1998.

Influences and Style 
Themes of life, mortality, routine and work are explored in Mark Threadgold's paintings. Multiple interpretations are often discovered in his work where subjects are carefully constructed and allegories are formed. Threadgold's paintings are realistic in style. His affinity with past masters is evident in his technical expertise. Traces of Caravaggesque naturalism and moody romanticism, combined with the textural invention of the artist, situate his work at the end of a linear history of painting. His work is influenced by artists such as Gerhard Richter, Francis Bacon, Caravaggio, Damien Hirst and Richard Prince.

Art Awards 
2011 Sunshine Coast Art Prize, Finalist
2009 Prometheus Art Award, Finalist
2008 Corangamarah Art Prize, Winner
2007 Metro 5 Art Award, Finalist
2006 Metro 5 Art Award, Finalist
2005 Lloyd Rees Memorial Art Prize, Finalist
2005 Metro 5 Art Award, Finalist
1998 Darian Art Prize Deakin University, Winner

Solo exhibitions
2016 Mark Threadgold, James Makin Gallery, Melbourne
2010 The New Now, Metro Gallery, Melbourne
2008 Twice A Day Every Day For the Rest of Your Life, Metro Gallery, Melbourne
2003 New Paintings, Intrude Gallery, Melbourne
2002 Mark Threadgold, St Lawrences, Norwich, England
2001 Mark Threadgold, Preview Gallery, Melbourne

References

External links
Mark Threadgold official website featuring artwork, artist profile, biography, news
Interview with Mark Threadgold

Australian painters
1977 births
Living people
Artists from Melbourne